Chionelasmus crosnieri is a species of symmetrical sessile barnacle in the family Chionelasmatidae.

References

External links

 

Sessilia

Crustaceans described in 1998